Pradhan Mantri Kaushal Vikas Yojana (PMKVY) is a skill development initiative scheme of the Government of India for recognition and standardisation of skills.

The aim of the PMKVY scheme is to encourage aptitude towards employable skills and to increase working efficiency of probable and existing daily wage earners, by giving monetary awards and rewards and by providing quality training to them. Those wage earners already possessing a standard level of skill will be given recognition as per scheme and average award amount for them is ₹2000 to ₹2500. In the initial year, a target to distribute  has been laid down for the scheme. Training programmes have been worked out on the basis of National Occupational Standards (NOS) and qualification packs specifically developed in various sectors of skills. For this qualification plans and quality plans have been developed by various Sector Skill Councils (SSC) created with participation of Industries. National Skill Development Council (NSDC) has been made coordinating and driving agency for the same.

An outlay of  has been approved by the cabinet for this project. The scheme has a target to train 1 crore Indian youth from 2016-20. As of 18 July 2016, 17.93 lakh candidates were trained out of 18 lakh who enrolled for the scheme.

See also 
Premiership of Narendra Modi
National Education Policy 2020

References

External links

Skills
Government schemes in India
Modi administration initiatives